The Raging Wrath of the Easter Bunny Demo is the fourth studio album by American experimental rock band Mr. Bungle, released on October 30, 2020, through Ipecac Recordings.

Background
This is a re-recording of the band's first self-released demo tape of the same name from 1986. It is their first album to be released in over 20 years. It is also the first album to feature new members Dave Lombardo on drums and guitarist Scott Ian.

Promotion
The band announced shortly after the reunion tour, they would be in the studio working on a re-recording of the demo that was performed in its entirety (with the exception of "Evil Satan" and most of "Hypocrites", which was shortened and filled out with a Stormtroopers of Death cover) along with three unrecorded songs in an interview with Revolver Magazine.

On August 13, 2020, the band revealed the album and the first single "Raping Your Mind" with a music video posted on YouTube.
This was followed by the release of a second single, and music video, for the song "Eracist" on September 24, 2020.

On October 23, 2020, the band released the closing track "Sudden Death" for streaming.

Critical reception

The Raging Wrath of the Easter Bunny was released to positive reception. At Metacritic, they assign a weighted average score to ratings and reviews from selected mainstream critics, which based upon six reviews, the album has a Metascore of 81. Consequence of Sound rated the album A−, stating, "The album could stand to be 10 minutes shorter, but who's to complain about having too much of a good thing? Recorded pre-pandemic, the joy and enthusiasm of the reunion tour is captured here and the results are immensely entertaining. If you like thrash, then the Raging Wrath of the Easter Bunny Demo is mandatory listening." Clash gave the album 7/10, writing, "There's a school of thought that argues Bungle's talents are wasted in this context. There are no audacious genre- surfers like 'Goodbye Sober Day' or 'Desert Search For Techno Allah'. For believers, it's great to have them back."

Track listing

Personnel
Mr. Bungle
Mike Patton – lead vocals
Trey Spruance – lead guitar
Trevor Dunn – bass
Scott Ian – rhythm guitar
Dave Lombardo – drums

Additional personnel
Rhea Perlman – narration on "Anarchy Up Your Anus"

Production
Husky Hoskulds – Recording Engineer
Jay Ruston – Mixing & Mastering
John Douglass – Assistant
Maor Appelbaum – Masters Prepared for Manufacturing

Charts

References 

Mr. Bungle albums
2020 albums